Jozef Bubenko (born 21 March 1951) is a Slovak football coach who last managed for Zemplín Michalovce.

He played for Tatran Prešov and Dukla Banská Bystrica.

He coached teams Tatran Prešov (1988–92), JAS BArdejov (1992–96), Inter Bratislava (1996–02), Panionios (2002–04 and 2005–06), Slovakia national under-21 football team (2004–05), Spartak Trnava (2006), Iraklis (2007 and since 2010).
On 7 August 2010 Bubenko decided to step down as coach of Iraklis.

Honours

Player
Tatran Prešov
Slovak Cup (1): 1981

Manager
Bardejov
2. Liga Winner: 1993–94 (Promoted)
Inter Bratislava
Slovak Super Liga (2): 1999–2000, 2000–01 
Slovak Cup (2): 1999–00, 2000–01

References

1951 births
Living people
Sportspeople from Prešov
Czechoslovak footballers
Slovak footballers
1. FC Tatran Prešov players
FK Dukla Banská Bystrica players
Czechoslovak football managers
Slovak football managers
Slovak expatriate football managers
MFK Slovan Giraltovce managers
1. FC Tatran Prešov managers
Partizán Bardejov managers
FC Spartak Trnava managers
Iraklis Thessaloniki F.C. managers
Panionios F.C. managers
Super League Greece managers
FC Mika managers
FK Inter Bratislava managers
MFK Zemplín Michalovce managers
Slovakia national under-21 football team managers
Expatriate football managers in Armenia
Expatriate football managers in Greece
Slovak expatriate sportspeople in Armenia
Slovak expatriate sportspeople in Greece
Association football forwards